Lanier House may refer to the following places in the United States:

Sidney Lanier Cottage, Macon, Georgia, NRHP-listed
Lanier Mansion, Madison, Indiana, NRHP-listed
Lanier House (Magnolia, Mississippi), listed on the NRHP in Pike County, Mississippi
James F. D. Lanier Residence, New York, New York, NRHP-listed

See also
 Lanier (disambiguation)